Juan de Uceda (Seville, 1570 – Seville, 1631) was a Spanish painter.  Formerly a student of Alonso Vázquez, he is known for his religious work.  Some of his paintings can be seen today in the Museum of Fine Arts of Seville.

External links
 Scholarly articles in English about Juan de Uceda both in web and PDF @ the Spanish Old Masters Gallery

1570 births
1631 deaths
16th-century Spanish painters
Spanish male painters
17th-century Spanish painters
Painters from Seville